A victory marking (also called a victory mark, kill marking, or kill mark) is a symbol applied in stencil or decal to the side of a military aircraft to denote an aerial victory achieved by the aircraft's pilot or crew. The use of victory markings originated during World War I,  burgeoned during World War II and frequently took the form of the roundel or national flag of the nationality of the aircraft defeated.

In the United States Air Force, as of 2010, victory markings are applied in the form of six inch green stars set within a black border with the type of aircraft defeated stenciled inside the star in white lettering.

Victory marks have been applied to aircraft for reasons other than aerial victories. During the period of its use for astronaut recovery, the U.S. Navy's Helicopter 66 bore victory marks showing a space capsule silhouette, with one mark added for each recovery in which it participated. In 2012, a German Eurofighter was spotted with a kill mark denoting a simulated victory over a U.S. Air Force F-22 Raptor, achieved in a dogfight during a training exercise.

Gallery

See also
 Flying ace
 Nose art

Further reading

References

External links

Military symbols